The Qingshuihe–Yining Expressway, commonly referred to as the Qingyi Expressway, is a  in the Ili Kazakh Autonomous Prefecture of Xinjiang, China. It connects the towns of Qingshuihe, in Huocheng County, and Bayandai, in Yining City (also known as Ghulja). It opened on 20 April 2009.

The expressway is an auxiliary line of the G30 Lianyungang–Khorgas Expressway. It branches from the G30 Lianyungang–Khorgas Expressway at Qingshuihe.

Route 
The expressway begins at an interchange with the G30 Lianyungang–Khorgas Expressway east of the town of Qingshuihe, in Huocheng County. It proceeds southward, crossing China National Highway 312 and paralleling much of China National Highway 218, which also connects Qingshuihe with Yining. The expressway runs beside China National Highway 218, before deviating eastward as it approaches Shuiding, the county seat of Huocheng County. It passes through the Huocheng Tunnel and then curves southward, joining China National Highway 218 again at the town of Huiyuan. The expressway returns to an easterly direction, paralleling China National Highway 218 for the rest of the route until its eastern terminus in Bayandai, in Yining City.

An extension of the expressway further eastward to the town of Dunmazha, in Yining County, called the Yining–Dunmazha Expressway, opened on December 16, 2013. It begins just before the eastern terminus of the Qingshuihe–Yining Expressway. This extension is not designated as part of G3015, but instead carries the new expressway alignment of China National Highway 218.

Exit list

References

Expressways in Xinjiang
Chinese national-level expressways